

Africa

President – Abdelaziz Bouteflika, President of Algeria (1999–2019)
Prime Minister – Ahmed Ouyahia, Prime Minister of Algeria (2008–2012)

President – José Eduardo dos Santos, President of Angola (1979–2017)
Prime Minister – Paulo Kassoma, Prime Minister of Angola (2008–2010)

President – Thomas Boni Yayi, President of Benin (2006–2016)

President – Ian Khama, President of Botswana (2008–2018)

President – Blaise Compaoré, President of Burkina Faso (1987–2014)
Prime Minister – Tertius Zongo, Prime Minister of Burkina Faso (2007–2011)

President – Pierre Nkurunziza, President of Burundi (2005–2020)

President – Paul Biya, President of Cameroon (1982–present)
Prime Minister –
Ephraïm Inoni, Prime Minister of Cameroon (2004–2009)
Philémon Yang, Prime Minister of Cameroon (2009–2019)

President – Pedro Pires, President of Cape Verde (2001–2011)
Prime Minister – José Maria Neves, Prime Minister of Cape Verde (2001–2016)

President – François Bozizé, President of the Central African Republic (2003–2013)
Prime Minister – Faustin-Archange Touadéra, Prime Minister of the Central African Republic (2008–2013)

President – Idriss Déby, President of Chad (1990–2021)
Prime Minister – Youssouf Saleh Abbas, Prime Minister of Chad (2008–2010)

President – Ahmed Abdallah Mohamed Sambi, President of the Comoros (2006–2011)

President – Denis Sassou Nguesso, President of the Republic of the Congo (1997–present)
Prime Minister – Isidore Mvouba, Prime Minister of the Republic of the Congo (2005–2009)

President – Joseph Kabila, President of the Democratic Republic of the Congo (2001–2019)
Prime Minister – Adolphe Muzito, Prime Minister of the Democratic Republic of the Congo (2008–2012)

President – Ismaïl Omar Guelleh, President of Djibouti (1999–present)
Prime Minister – Dileita Mohamed Dileita, Prime Minister of Djibouti (2001–2013)

President – Hosni Mubarak, President of Egypt (1981–2011)
Prime Minister – Ahmed Nazif, Prime Minister of Egypt (2004–2011)

President – Teodoro Obiang Nguema Mbasogo, President of Equatorial Guinea (1979–present)
Prime Minister – Ignacio Milam Tang, Prime Minister of Equatorial Guinea (2008–2012)

President – Isaias Afwerki, President of Eritrea (1991–present)
 
President – Girma Wolde-Giorgis, President of Ethiopia (2001–2013)
Prime Minister – Meles Zenawi, Prime Minister of Ethiopia (1995–2012)

President –
Omar Bongo, President of Gabon (1967–2009)
Didjob Divungi Di Ndinge, Acting President of Gabon (2009)
Rose Francine Rogombé, Acting President of Gabon (2009)
Ali Bongo Ondimba, President of Gabon (2009–present)
Prime Minister –
Jean Eyeghé Ndong, Prime Minister of Gabon (2006–2009)
Paul Biyoghé Mba, Prime Minister of Gabon (2009–2012)

President – Yahya Jammeh, President of the Gambia (1994–2017)

President –
John Kufuor, President of Ghana (2001–2009)
John Atta Mills, President of Ghana (2009–2012)

President –
Moussa Dadis Camara, President of Guinea (2008–2009)
Sékouba Konaté, Acting President of Guinea (2009–2010)
Prime Minister – Kabiné Komara, Prime Minister of Guinea (2008–2010)

President –
João Bernardo Vieira, President of Guinea-Bissau (2005–2009)
Raimundo Pereira, Acting President of Guinea-Bissau (2009)
Malam Bacai Sanhá, President of Guinea-Bissau (2009–2012)
Prime Minister –
Carlos Correia, Prime Minister of Guinea-Bissau (2008–2009)
Carlos Gomes Júnior, Prime Minister of Guinea-Bissau (2009–2012)

President – Laurent Gbagbo, President of the Ivory Coast (2000–2011)
Prime Minister – Guillaume Soro, Prime Minister of the Ivory Coast (2007–2012)

President – Mwai Kibaki, President of Kenya (2002–2013)
Prime Minister – Raila Odinga, Prime Minister of Kenya (2008–2013)

Monarch – Letsie III, King of Lesotho (1996–present)
Prime Minister – Pakalitha Mosisili, Prime Minister of Lesotho (1998–2012)

President – Ellen Johnson Sirleaf, President of Liberia (2006–2018)

De facto Head of State – Muammar Gaddafi, Guide of the Revolution of Libya (1969–2011)
De jure Head of State –
Miftah Muhammed K'eba, General Secretary of the General People's Congress of Libya (2008–2009)
Imbarek Shamekh, General Secretary of the General People's Congress of Libya (2009–2010)
Prime Minister – Baghdadi Mahmudi, General Secretary of the General People's Committee of Libya (2006–2011)

Head of State –
Marc Ravalomanana, President of Madagascar (2002–2009)
Andry Rajoelina, President of the High Transitional Authority of Madagascar (2009–2014)
Prime Minister –
Charles Rabemananjara, Prime Minister of Madagascar (2007–2009)
Monja Roindefo, Prime Minister of Madagascar (2009)
Eugène Mangalaza, Prime Minister of Madagascar (2009)
Albert Camille Vital, Prime Minister of Madagascar (2009–2011)

President – Bingu wa Mutharika, President of Malawi (2004–2012)

President – Amadou Toumani Touré, President of Mali (2002–2012)
Prime Minister – Modibo Sidibé, Prime Minister of Mali (2007–2011)

Head of State –
Mohamed Ould Abdel Aziz, President of the High Council of State of Mauritania (2008–2009)
Ba Mamadou Mbaré, Acting President of Mauritania (2009)
Mohamed Ould Abdel Aziz, President of Mauritania (2009–2019)
Prime Minister – Moulaye Ould Mohamed Laghdaf, Prime Minister of Mauritania (2008–2014)

President – Sir Anerood Jugnauth, President of Mauritius (2003–2012)
Prime Minister – Navin Ramgoolam, Prime Minister of Mauritius (2005–2014)
  (overseas collectivity of France)
Prefect –
Denis Robin, Prefect of Mayotte (2008–2009)
Christophe Peyrel, Acting Prefect of Mayotte (2009)
Hubert Derache, Prefect of Mayotte (2009–2011)
Head of Government – Ahmed Attoumani Douchina, President of the General Council of Mayotte (2008–2011)

Monarch – Mohammed VI, King of Morocco (1999–present)
Prime Minister – Abbas El Fassi, Prime Minister of Morocco (2007–2011)
 (self-declared, partially recognised state)
President – Mohamed Abdelaziz, President of Western Sahara (1976–2016)
Prime Minister – Abdelkader Taleb Omar, Prime Minister of Western Sahara (2003–2018)

President – Armando Guebuza, President of Mozambique (2005–2015)
Prime Minister – Luísa Diogo, Prime Minister of Mozambique (2004–2010)

President – Hifikepunye Pohamba, President of Namibia (2005–2015)
Prime Minister – Nahas Angula, Prime Minister of Namibia (2005–2012)

President – Mamadou Tandja, President of Niger (1999–2010)
Prime Minister –
Seyni Oumarou, Prime Minister of Niger (2007–2009)
Albadé Abouba, Acting Prime Minister of Niger (2009)
Ali Badjo Gamatié, Prime Minister of Niger (2009–2010)

President – Umaru Musa Yar'Adua, President of Nigeria (2007–2010)

President – Paul Kagame, President of Rwanda (2000–present)
Prime Minister – Bernard Makuza, Prime Minister of Rwanda (2000–2011)
 (Overseas Territory of the United Kingdom)
renamed from Saint Helena and Dependencies on 1 September
Governor – Andrew Gurr, Governor of Saint Helena (2007–2011)

President – Fradique de Menezes, President of São Tomé and Príncipe (2003–2011)
Prime Minister – Joaquim Rafael Branco, Prime Minister of São Tomé and Príncipe (2008–2010)

President – Abdoulaye Wade, President of Senegal (2000–2012)
Prime Minister –
Cheikh Hadjibou Soumaré, Prime Minister of Senegal (2007–2009)
Souleymane Ndéné Ndiaye, Prime Minister of Senegal (2009–2012)

President – James Michel, President of Seychelles (2004–2016)

President – Ernest Bai Koroma, President of Sierra Leone (2007–2018)

President –
Adan Mohamed Nuur Madobe, Acting President of Somalia (2008–2009)
Sharif Sheikh Ahmed, President of Somalia (2009–2012)
Prime Minister –
Nur Hassan Hussein, Prime Minister of Somalia (2007–2009)
Omar Abdirashid Ali Sharmarke, Prime Minister of Somalia (2009–2010)
 (unrecognised, secessionist state)
President – Dahir Riyale Kahin, President of Somaliland (2002–2010)
  (self-declared autonomous state)
President –
Mohamud Muse Hersi, President of Puntland (2005–2009)
Abdirahman Farole, President of Puntland (2009–2014)
 (unrecognised, autonomous state)
rejoined the Puntland State of Somalia on 11 January
President –
Jibrell Ali Salad, President of Maakhir (2007–2009)
Abdullahi Ahmed Jama, President of Maakhir (claimant, 2008–2009)

President –
Kgalema Motlanthe, President of South Africa (2008–2009)
Jacob Zuma, President of South Africa (2009–2018)

President – Omar al-Bashir, President of Sudan (1989–2019)

Monarch – Mswati III, King of Swaziland (1986–present)
Prime Minister – Barnabas Sibusiso Dlamini, Prime Minister of Swaziland (2008–2018)

President – Jakaya Kikwete, President of Tanzania (2005–2015)
Prime Minister – Mizengo Pinda, Prime Minister of Tanzania (2008–2015)

President – Faure Gnassingbé, President of Togo (2005–present)
Prime Minister – Gilbert Houngbo, Prime Minister of Togo (2008–2012)

President – Zine El Abidine Ben Ali, President of Tunisia (1987–2011)
Prime Minister – Mohamed Ghannouchi, Prime Minister of Tunisia (1999–2011)

President – Yoweri Museveni, President of Uganda (1986–present)
Prime Minister – Apolo Nsibambi, Prime Minister of Uganda (1999–2011)

President – Rupiah Banda, President of Zambia (2008–2011)

President – Robert Mugabe, President of Zimbabwe (1987–2017)
Prime Minister – Morgan Tsvangirai, Prime Minister of Zimbabwe (2009–2013)

Asia

President – Hamid Karzai, President of Afghanistan (2002–2014)

Monarch – Sheikh Hamad bin Isa Al Khalifa, King of Bahrain (1999–present)
Prime Minister – Prince Khalifa bin Salman Al Khalifa, Prime Minister of Bahrain (1970–2020)

President –
Iajuddin Ahmed, President of Bangladesh (2002–2009)
Zillur Rahman, President of Bangladesh (2009–2013)
Prime Minister –
Fakhruddin Ahmed, Chief Adviser of Bangladesh (2007–2009)
Sheikh Hasina, Prime Minister of Bangladesh (2009–present)

Monarch – Jigme Khesar Namgyel Wangchuck, King of Bhutan (2006–present)
Prime Minister – Jigme Thinley, Prime Minister of Bhutan (2008–2013)

Monarch – Hassanal Bolkiah, Sultan of Brunei (1967–present)
Prime Minister – Hassanal Bolkiah, Prime Minister of Brunei (1984–present)

Monarch – Norodom Sihamoni, King of Cambodia (2004–present)
Prime Minister – Hun Sen, Prime Minister of Cambodia (1985–present)

Communist Party Leader – Hu Jintao, General Secretary of the Chinese Communist Party (2002–2012)
President – Hu Jintao, President of China (2003–2013)
Premier – Wen Jiabao, Premier of the State Council of China (2003–2013)

President – José Ramos-Horta, President of East Timor (2007–2012)
Prime Minister – Xanana Gusmão, Prime Minister of East Timor (2007–2015)

President – Pratibha Patil, President of India (2007–2012)
Prime Minister – Manmohan Singh, Prime Minister of India (2004–2014)

President – Susilo Bambang Yudhoyono, President of Indonesia (2004–2014)

Supreme Leader – Ayatollah Ali Khamenei, Supreme Leader of Iran (1989–present)
President – Mahmoud Ahmadinejad, President of Iran (2005–2013)

Head of State – Presidency Council of Iraq
Members – Jalal Talabani (2006–2010; President of Iraq, 2006–2010), and Adil Abdul-Mahdi and Tariq al-Hashimi (2006–2010)
Prime Minister – Nouri al-Maliki, Prime Minister of Iraq (2006–2014)

President – Shimon Peres, President of Israel (2007–2014)
Prime Minister –
Ehud Olmert, Prime Minister of Israel (2006–2009)
Benjamin Netanyahu, Prime Minister of Israel (2009–2021)
 (non-state administrative authority)
President – Mahmoud Abbas, President of the Palestinian National Authority (in the West Bank) (2005–present)
Prime Minister – Salam Fayyad, Prime Minister of the Palestinian National Authority (in the West Bank) (2007–2013)
  Gaza Strip (rebelling against the Palestinian National Authority, in the West Bank)
President – Aziz Duwaik, Acting President of the Palestinian National Authority (in the Gaza Strip) (2009–2014)
Prime Minister – Ismail Haniyeh, Prime Minister of the Palestinian National Authority (in the Gaza Strip) (2007–2014)

Monarch – Akihito, Emperor of Japan (1989–2019)
Prime Minister –
Tarō Asō, Prime Minister of Japan (2008–2009)
Yukio Hatoyama, Prime Minister of Japan (2009–2010)

Monarch – Abdullah II, King of Jordan (1999–present)
Prime Minister –
Nader al-Dahabi, Prime Minister of Jordan (2007–2009)
Samir Rifai, Prime Minister of Jordan (2009–2011)

President – Nursultan Nazarbayev, President of Kazakhstan (1990–2019)
Prime Minister – Karim Massimov, Prime Minister of Kazakhstan (2007–2012)

Communist Party Leader – Kim Jong-il, General Secretary of the Workers' Party of Korea (1997–2011)
De facto Head of State – Kim Jong-il, Chairman of the National Defence Commission of North Korea (1993–2011)
De jure Head of State – Kim Yong-nam, Chairman of the Presidium of the Supreme People's Assembly of North Korea (1998–2019)
Premier – Kim Yong-il, Premier of the Cabinet of North Korea (2007–2010)

President – Lee Myung-bak, President of South Korea (2008–2013)
Prime Minister –
Han Seung-soo, Prime Minister of South Korea (2008–2009)
Chung Un-chan, Prime Minister of South Korea (2009–2010)

Monarch – Sheikh Sabah Al-Ahmad Al-Jaber Al-Sabah, Emir of Kuwait (2006–2020)
Prime Minister – Sheikh Nasser Al-Sabah, Prime Minister of Kuwait (2006–2011)

President – Kurmanbek Bakiyev, President of Kyrgyzstan (2005–2010)
Prime Minister –
Igor Chudinov, Prime Minister of Kyrgyzstan (2007–2009)
Daniar Usenov, Prime Minister of Kyrgyzstan (2009–2010)

Communist Party Leader – Choummaly Sayasone, General Secretary of the Lao People's Revolutionary Party (2006–2016)
President – Choummaly Sayasone, President of Laos (2006–2016)
Premier – Bouasone Bouphavanh, Chairman of the Council of Ministers of Laos (2006–2010)

President – Michel Suleiman, President of Lebanon (2008–2014)
Prime Minister –
Fouad Siniora, President of the Council of Ministers of Lebanon (2005–2009)
Saad Hariri, President of the Council of Ministers of Lebanon (2009–2011)

Monarch – Tuanku Mizan Zainal Abidin, Yang di-Pertuan Agong of Malaysia (2006–2011)
Prime Minister –
Abdullah Ahmad Badawi, Prime Minister of Malaysia (2003–2009)
Najib Razak, Prime Minister of Malaysia (2009–2018)

President – Mohamed Nasheed, President of the Maldives (2008–2012)

President –
Nambaryn Enkhbayar, President of Mongolia (2005–2009)
Tsakhiagiin Elbegdorj, President of Mongolia (2009–2017)
Prime Minister –
Sanjaagiin Bayar, Prime Minister of Mongolia (2007–2009)
Sükhbaataryn Batbold, Prime Minister of Mongolia (2009–2012)

Head of State – Than Shwe, Chairman of the State Peace and Development Council of Myanmar (1992–2011)
Prime Minister – Thein Sein, Prime Minister of Myanmar (2007–2011)

President – Ram Baran Yadav, President of Nepal (2008–2015)
Prime Minister –
Pushpa Kamal Dahal, Prime Minister of Nepal (2008–2009)
Madhav Kumar Nepal, Prime Minister of Nepal (2009–2011)

Monarch – Qaboos bin Said al Said, Sultan of Oman (1970–present)
Prime Minister – Qaboos bin Said al Said, Prime Minister of Oman (1972–present)

President – Asif Ali Zardari, President of Pakistan (2008–2013)
Prime Minister – Yousaf Raza Gillani, Prime Minister of Pakistan (2008–2012)

President – Gloria Macapagal Arroyo, President of the Philippines (2001–2010)

Monarch – Sheikh Hamad bin Khalifa Al Thani, Emir of Qatar (1995–2013)
Prime Minister – Sheikh Hamad bin Jassim bin Jaber Al Thani, Prime Minister of Qatar (2007–2013)

Monarch – Abdullah, King of Saudi Arabia (2005–2015)
Prime Minister – Abdullah, Prime Minister of Saudi Arabia (2005–2015)

President – S. R. Nathan, President of Singapore (1999–2011)
Prime Minister – Lee Hsien Loong, Prime Minister of Singapore (2004–present)

President – Mahinda Rajapaksa, President of Sri Lanka (2005–2015)
Prime Minister – Ratnasiri Wickremanayake, Prime Minister of Sri Lanka (2005–2010)

President – Bashar al-Assad, President of Syria (2000–present)
Prime Minister – Muhammad Naji al-Otari, Prime Minister of Syria (2003–2011)

President – Ma Ying-jeou, President of Taiwan (2008–2016)
Premier –
Liu Chao-shiuan, President of the Executive Yuan of Taiwan (2008–2009)
Wu Den-yih, President of the Executive Yuan of Taiwan (2009–2012)

President – Emomali Rahmon, President of Tajikistan (1992–present)
Prime Minister – Oqil Oqilov, Prime Minister of Tajikistan (1999–2013)

Monarch – Bhumibol Adulyadej, King of Thailand (1946–2016)
Prime Minister – Abhisit Vejjajiva, Prime Minister of Thailand (2008–2011)

President – Abdullah Gül, President of Turkey (2007–2014)
Prime Minister – Recep Tayyip Erdoğan, Prime Minister of Turkey (2003–2014)

President – Gurbanguly Berdimuhamedow, President of Turkmenistan (2006–2022)

President – Sheikh Khalifa bin Zayed Al Nahyan, President of the United Arab Emirates (2004–2022)
Prime Minister – Sheikh Mohammed bin Rashid Al Maktoum, Prime Minister of the United Arab Emirates (2006–present)

President – Islam Karimov, President of Uzbekistan (1990–2016)
Prime Minister – Shavkat Mirziyoyev, Prime Minister of Uzbekistan (2003–2016)

Communist Party Leader – Nông Đức Mạnh, General Secretary of the Communist Party of Vietnam (2001–2011)
President – Nguyễn Minh Triết, President of Vietnam (2006–2011)
Prime Minister – Nguyễn Tấn Dũng, Prime Minister of Vietnam (2006–2016)

President – Ali Abdullah Saleh, President of Yemen (1978–2012)
Prime Minister – Ali Muhammad Mujawar, Prime Minister of Yemen (2007–2011)

Europe

President – Bamir Topi, President of Albania (2007–2012)
Prime Minister – Sali Berisha, Prime Minister of Albania (2005–2013)

Monarchs –
French Co-Prince – Nicolas Sarkozy, French Co-prince of Andorra (2007–2012)
Co-Prince's Representative – Christian Frémont (2008–2012)
Episcopal Co-Prince – Joan Enric Vives Sicília, Episcopal Co-prince of Andorra (2003–present)
Co-Prince's Representative – Nemesi Marqués Oste (1993–2012)
Prime Minister –
Albert Pintat, Head of Government of Andorra (2005–2009)
Jaume Bartumeu, Head of Government of Andorra (2009–2011)

President – Serzh Sargsyan, President of Armenia (2008–2018)
Prime Minister – Tigran Sargsyan, Prime Minister of Armenia (2008–2014)

President – Heinz Fischer, Federal President of Austria (2004–2016)
Chancellor – Werner Faymann, Federal Chancellor of Austria (2008–2016)

President – Ilham Aliyev, President of Azerbaijan (2003–present)
Prime Minister – Artur Rasizade, Prime Minister of Azerbaijan (2003–2018)
 (unrecognised, secessionist state)
President – Bako Sahakyan, President of Nagorno-Karabakh (2007–2020)
Prime Minister – Arayik Harutyunyan, Prime Minister of Nagorno-Karabakh (2007–2017)

President – Alexander Lukashenko, President of Belarus (1994–present)
Prime Minister – Sergei Sidorsky, Prime Minister of Belarus (2003–2010)

Monarch – Albert II, King of the Belgians (1993–2013)
Prime Minister –
Herman Van Rompuy, Prime Minister of Belgium (2008–2009)
Yves Leterme, Prime Minister of Belgium (2009–2011)

Head of State – Presidency of Bosnia and Herzegovina
Serb Member – Nebojša Radmanović (2006–2014; Chairman of the Presidency of Bosnia and Herzegovina, 2008–2009)
Bosniak Member – Haris Silajdžić (2006–2010)
Croat Member – Željko Komšić (2006–2014; Chairman of the Presidency of Bosnia and Herzegovina, 2009–2010)
Prime Minister – Nikola Špirić, Chairman of the Council of Ministers of Bosnia and Herzegovina (2007–2012)
High Representative –
Miroslav Lajčák, High Representative for Bosnia and Herzegovina (2007–2009)
Valentin Inzko, High Representative for Bosnia and Herzegovina (2009-2021)

President – Georgi Parvanov, President of Bulgaria (2002–2012)
Prime Minister –
Sergei Stanishev, Prime Minister of Bulgaria (2005–2009)
Boyko Borisov, Prime Minister of Bulgaria (2009–2013)

President – Stjepan Mesić, President of Croatia (2000–2010)
Prime Minister –
Ivo Sanader, Prime Minister of Croatia (2003–2009)
Jadranka Kosor, Prime Minister of Croatia (2009–2011)

President – Demetris Christofias, President of Cyprus (2008–2013)
 (unrecognised, secessionist state)
President – Mehmet Ali Talat, President of Northern Cyprus (2005–2010)
Prime Minister –
Ferdi Sabit Soyer, Prime Minister of Northern Cyprus (2005–2009)
Derviş Eroğlu, Prime Minister of Northern Cyprus (2009–2010)

President – Václav Klaus, President of the Czech Republic (2003–2013)
Prime Minister –
Mirek Topolánek, Prime Minister of the Czech Republic (2006–2009)
Jan Fischer, Prime Minister of the Czech Republic (2009–2010)

Monarch – Margrethe II, Queen of Denmark (1972–present)
Prime Minister –
Anders Fogh Rasmussen, Prime Minister of Denmark (2001–2009)
Lars Løkke Rasmussen, Prime Minister of Denmark (2009–2011)

President – Toomas Hendrik Ilves, President of Estonia (2006–2016)
Prime Minister – Andrus Ansip, Prime Minister of Estonia (2005–2014)

President – Tarja Halonen, President of Finland (2000–2012)
Prime Minister – Matti Vanhanen, Prime Minister of Finland (2003–2010)

President – Nicolas Sarkozy, President of France (2007–2012)
Prime Minister – François Fillon, Prime Minister of France (2007–2012)

President – Mikheil Saakashvili, President of Georgia (2008–2013)
Prime Minister –
Grigol Mgaloblishvili, Prime Minister of Georgia (2008–2009)
Nika Gilauri, Prime Minister of Georgia (2009–2012)
 (partially recognised, secessionist state)
President – Sergei Bagapsh, President of Abkhazia (2005–2011)
Prime Minister – Aleksander Ankvab, Prime Minister of Abkhazia (2005–2010)
 (partially recognised, secessionist state)
President – Eduard Kokoity, President of South Ossetia (2001–2011)
Prime Minister –
Aslanbek Bulatsev, Prime Minister of South Ossetia (2008–2009)
Vadim Brovtsev, Prime Minister of South Ossetia (2009–2012)

President – Horst Köhler, Federal President of Germany (2004–2010)
Chancellor – Angela Merkel, Federal Chancellor of Germany (2005–2021)

President – Karolos Papoulias, President of Greece (2005–2015)
Prime Minister –
Kostas Karamanlis, Prime Minister of Greece (2004–2009)
George Papandreou, Prime Minister of Greece (2009–2011)

President – László Sólyom, President of Hungary (2005–2010)
Prime Minister –
Ferenc Gyurcsány, Prime Minister of Hungary (2004–2009)
Gordon Bajnai, Prime Minister of Hungary (2009–2010)

President – Ólafur Ragnar Grímsson, President of Iceland (1996–2016)
Prime Minister –
Geir Haarde, Prime Minister of Iceland (2006–2009)
Jóhanna Sigurðardóttir, Prime Minister of Iceland (2009–2013)

President – Mary McAleese, President of Ireland (1997–2011)
Prime Minister – Brian Cowen, Taoiseach of Ireland (2008–2011)

President – Giorgio Napolitano, President of Italy (2006–2015)
Prime Minister – Silvio Berlusconi, President of the Council of Ministers of Italy (2008–2011)

President – Valdis Zatlers, President of Latvia (2007–2011)
Prime Minister –
Ivars Godmanis, Prime Minister of Latvia (2007–2009)
Valdis Dombrovskis, Prime Minister of Latvia (2009–2014)

Monarch – Hans-Adam II, Prince Regnant of Liechtenstein (1989–present)
Regent – Hereditary Prince Alois, Regent of Liechtenstein (2004–present)
Prime Minister –
Otmar Hasler, Prime Minister of Liechtenstein (2001–2009)
Klaus Tschütscher, Head of Government of Liechtenstein (2009–2013)

President –
Valdas Adamkus, President of Lithuania (2004–2009)
Dalia Grybauskaitė, President of Lithuania (2009–2019)
Prime Minister – Andrius Kubilius, Prime Minister of Lithuania (2008–2012)

Monarch – Henri, Grand Duke of Luxembourg (2000–present)
Prime Minister – Jean-Claude Juncker, Prime Minister of Luxembourg (1995–2013)

President –
Branko Crvenkovski, President of Macedonia (2004–2009)
Gjorge Ivanov, President of Macedonia (2009–2019)
Prime Minister – Nikola Gruevski, President of the Government of Macedonia (2006–2016)

President –
Eddie Fenech Adami, President of Malta (2004–2009)
George Abela, President of Malta (2009–2014)
Prime Minister – Lawrence Gonzi, Prime Minister of Malta (2004–2013)

President –
Vladimir Voronin, President of Moldova (2001–2009)
Mihai Ghimpu, Acting President of Moldova (2009–2010)
Prime Minister –
Zinaida Greceanîi, Prime Minister of Moldova (2008–2009)
Vitalie Pîrlog, Acting Prime Minister of Moldova (2009)
Vlad Filat, Prime Minister of Moldova (2009–2013)
 (unrecognised, secessionist state)
President – Igor Smirnov, President of Transnistria (1990–2011)

Monarch – Albert II, Sovereign Prince of Monaco (2005–present)
Prime Minister – Jean-Paul Proust, Minister of State of Monaco (2005–2010)

President – Filip Vujanović, President of Montenegro (2003–2018)
Prime Minister – Milo Đukanović, President of the Government of Montenegro (2008–2010)

Monarch – Beatrix, Queen of the Netherlands (1980–2013)
 (constituent country of the Kingdom of the Netherlands)
Prime Minister – Jan Peter Balkenende, Prime Minister of the Netherlands (2002–2010)
 (constituent country of the Kingdom of the Netherlands)
see 
 (constituent country of the Kingdom of the Netherlands)
see 

Monarch – Harald V, King of Norway (1991–present)
Prime Minister – Jens Stoltenberg, Prime Minister of Norway (2005–2013)

President – Lech Kaczyński, President of Poland (2005–2010)
Prime Minister – Donald Tusk, Chairman of the Council of Ministers of Poland (2007–2014)

President – Aníbal Cavaco Silva, President of Portugal (2006–2016)
Prime Minister – José Sócrates, Prime Minister of Portugal (2005–2011)

President – Traian Băsescu, President of Romania (2004–2014)
Prime Minister – Emil Boc, Prime Minister of Romania (2008–2012)

President – Dmitry Medvedev, President of Russia (2008–2012)
Prime Minister – Vladimir Putin, Chairman of the Government of Russia (2008–2012)

Captains-Regent –
Ernesto Benedettini and Assunta Meloni, Captains Regent of San Marino (2008–2009)
Massimo Cenci and Oscar Mina, Captains Regent of San Marino (2009)
Francesco Mussoni and Stefano Palmieri, Captains Regent of San Marino (2009–2010)

President – Boris Tadić, President of Serbia (2004–2012)
Prime Minister – Mirko Cvetković, President of the Government of Serbia (2008–2012)
 (partially recognised, secessionist state; under nominal international administration)
President – Fatmir Sejdiu, President of Kosovo (2006–2010)
Prime Minister – Hashim Thaçi, Prime Minister of Kosovo (2008–2014)
UN Special Representative – Lamberto Zannier, Special Representative of the UN Secretary-General for Kosovo (2008–2011)

President – Ivan Gašparovič, President of Slovakia (2004–2014)
Prime Minister – Robert Fico, Prime Minister of Slovakia (2006–2010)

President – Danilo Türk, President of Slovenia (2007–2012)
Prime Minister – Borut Pahor, Prime Minister of Slovenia (2008–2012)

Monarch – Juan Carlos I, King of Spain (1975–2014)
Prime Minister – José Luis Rodríguez Zapatero, President of the Government of Spain (2004–2011)

Monarch – Carl XVI Gustaf, King of Sweden (1973–present)
Prime Minister – Fredrik Reinfeldt, Prime Minister of Sweden (2006–2014)

Council – Federal Council of Switzerland
Members – Moritz Leuenberger (1995–2010), Pascal Couchepin (1998–2009), Micheline Calmy-Rey (2002–2011), Hans-Rudolf Merz (2003–2010; President of Switzerland, 2009), Doris Leuthard (2006–present), Eveline Widmer-Schlumpf (2008–2015), Ueli Maurer (2009–present), and Didier Burkhalter (2009–present)

President – Viktor Yushchenko, President of Ukraine (2005–2010)
Prime Minister – Yulia Tymoshenko, Prime Minister of Ukraine (2007–2010)

Monarch – Elizabeth II, Queen of the United Kingdom (1952–2022)
Prime Minister – Gordon Brown, Prime Minister of the United Kingdom (2007–2010)
 (Crown dependency of the United Kingdom)
Lieutenant-Governor – Sir Paul Haddacks, Lieutenant Governor of the Isle of Man (2005–2011)
Chief Minister – Tony Brown, Chief Minister of the Isle of Man (2006–2011)
 (Crown dependency of the United Kingdom)
Lieutenant-Governor – Sir Fabian Malbon, Lieutenant Governor of Guernsey (2005–2011)
Chief Minister – Lyndon Trott, Chief Minister of Guernsey (2008–2012)
 (Crown dependency of the United Kingdom)
Lieutenant-Governor – Andrew Ridgway, Lieutenant Governor of Jersey (2006–2011)
Chief Minister – Terry Le Sueur, Chief Minister of Jersey (2008–2011)
 (Overseas Territory of the United Kingdom)
Governor –
Sir Robert Fulton, Governor of Gibraltar (2006–2009)
Leslie Pallett, Acting Governor of Gibraltar (2009)
Sir Adrian Johns, Governor of Gibraltar (2009–2013)
Chief Minister – Peter Caruana, Chief Minister of Gibraltar (1996–2011)

Monarch – Pope Benedict XVI, Sovereign of Vatican City (2005–2013)
Head of Government – Cardinal Giovanni Lajolo, President of the Governorate of Vatican City (2006–2011)
Holy See (sui generis subject of public international law)
Secretary of State – Cardinal Tarcisio Bertone, Cardinal Secretary of State (2006–2013)

North America
 (Overseas Territory of the United Kingdom)
Governor –
Andrew George, Governor of Anguilla (2006–2009)
Stanley Reid, Acting Governor of Anguilla (2009)
Alistair Harrison, Governor of Anguilla (2009–2013)
Chief Minister – Osbourne Fleming, Chief Minister of Anguilla (2000–2010)

Monarch – Elizabeth II, Queen of Antigua and Barbuda (1981–present)
Governor-General – Dame Louise Lake-Tack, Governor-General of Antigua and Barbuda (2007–2014)
Prime Minister – Baldwin Spencer, Prime Minister of Antigua and Barbuda (2004–2014)
 (constituent country of the Kingdom of the Netherlands)
Governor – Fredis Refunjol, Governor of Aruba (2004–2016)
Prime Minister –
Nelson Oduber, Prime Minister of Aruba (2001–2009)
Mike Eman, Prime Minister of Aruba (2009–present)

Monarch – Elizabeth II, Queen of the Bahamas (1973–present)
Governor-General – Arthur Dion Hanna, Governor-General of the Bahamas (2006–2010)
Prime Minister – Hubert Ingraham, Prime Minister of the Bahamas (2007–2012)

Monarch – Elizabeth II, Queen of Barbados (1966–2021)
Governor-General – Sir Clifford Husbands, Governor-General of Barbados (1996–2011)
Prime Minister – David Thompson, Prime Minister of Barbados (2008–2010)

Monarch – Elizabeth II, Queen of Belize (1981–present)
Governor-General – Sir Colville Young, Governor-General of Belize (1993–2021)
Prime Minister – Dean Barrow, Prime Minister of Belize (2008–2020)
 (Overseas Territory of the United Kingdom)
Governor – Sir Richard Gozney, Governor of Bermuda (2007–2012)
Premier – Ewart Brown, Premier of Bermuda (2006–2010)
 (Overseas Territory of the United Kingdom)
Governor – David Pearey, Governor of the British Virgin Islands (2006–2010)
Premier – Ralph T. O'Neal, Premier of the British Virgin Islands (2007–2011)

Monarch – Elizabeth II, Queen of Canada (1952–present)
Governor-General – Michaëlle Jean, Governor General of Canada (2005–2010)
Prime Minister – Stephen Harper, Prime Minister of Canada (2006–2015)
 (Overseas Territory of the United Kingdom)
Governor –
Stuart Jack, Governor of the Cayman Islands (2005–2009)
Donovan Ebanks, Acting Governor of the Cayman Islands (2009–2010)
Head of Government –
Kurt Tibbetts, Leader of Government Business of the Cayman Islands (2005–2009)
McKeeva Bush, Premier of the Cayman Islands (2009–2012)

President – Óscar Arias, President of Costa Rica (2006–2010)

Communist Party Leader –
 Fidel Castro, First Secretary of the Communist Party of Cuba (1965–2011)
 Raúl Castro, Acting First Secretary of the Communist Party of Cuba (2006–2011)
President – Raúl Castro, President of the Council of State of Cuba (2008–2018)
Prime Minister – Raúl Castro, President of the Council of Ministers of Cuba (2008–2018)

President – Nicholas Liverpool, President of Dominica (2003–2012)
Prime Minister – Roosevelt Skerrit, Prime Minister of Dominica (2004–present)

President – Leonel Fernández, President of the Dominican Republic (2004–2012)

President –
Antonio Saca, President of El Salvador (2004–2009)
Mauricio Funes, President of El Salvador (2009–2014)

Monarch – Elizabeth II, Queen of Grenada (1974–present)
Governor-General – Sir Carlyle Glean, Governor-General of Grenada (2008–2013)
Prime Minister – Tillman Thomas, Prime Minister of Grenada (2008–2013)

President – Álvaro Colom, President of Guatemala (2008–2012)

President – René Préval, President of Haiti (2006–2011)
Prime Minister –
Michèle Pierre-Louis, Prime Minister of Haiti (2008–2009)
Jean-Max Bellerive, Prime Minister of Haiti (2009–2011)

President –
Manuel Zelaya, President of Honduras (2006–2009)
Roberto Micheletti, President of Honduras (2009–2010)

Monarch – Elizabeth II, Queen of Jamaica (1962–present)
Governor-General –
Sir Kenneth O. Hall, Governor-General of Jamaica (2006–2009)
Sir Patrick Allen, Governor-General of Jamaica (2009–present)
Prime Minister – Bruce Golding, Prime Minister of Jamaica (2007–2011)

President – Felipe Calderón, President of Mexico (2006–2012)
 (Overseas Territory of the United Kingdom)
Governor – Peter Waterworth, Governor of Montserrat (2007–2011)
Chief Minister –
Lowell Lewis, Chief Minister of Montserrat (2006–2009)
Reuben Meade, Chief Minister of Montserrat (2009–2014)
 (constituent country of the Kingdom of the Netherlands)
Governor – Frits Goedgedrag, Governor of the Netherlands Antilles (2002–2010)
Prime Minister – Emily de Jongh-Elhage, Prime Minister of the Netherlands Antilles (2006–2010)

President – Daniel Ortega, President of Nicaragua (2007–present)

President –
Martín Torrijos, President of Panama (2004–2009)
Ricardo Martinelli, President of Panama (2009–2014)
  (overseas collectivity of France)
Prefect –
Dominique Lacroix, Prefect of Saint Barthélemy (2007–2009)
Jacques Simonnet, Prefect of Saint Barthélemy (2009–2011)
Head of Government – Bruno Magras, President of the Territorial Council of Saint Barthélemy (2007–present)

Monarch – Elizabeth II, Queen of Saint Kitts and Nevis (1983–present)
Governor-General – Sir Cuthbert Sebastian, Governor-General of Saint Kitts and Nevis (1996–2013)
Prime Minister – Denzil Douglas, Prime Minister of Saint Kitts and Nevis (1995–2015)

Monarch – Elizabeth II, Queen of Saint Lucia (1979–present)
Governor-General – Dame Pearlette Louisy, Governor-General of Saint Lucia (1997–2017)
Prime Minister – Stephenson King, Prime Minister of Saint Lucia (2007–2011)
 (overseas collectivity of France)
Prefect –
Dominique Lacroix, Prefect of Saint Martin (2007–2009)
Jacques Simonnet, Prefect of Saint Martin (2009–2011)
Head of Government –
Frantz Gumbs, President of the Territorial Council of Saint Martin (2008–2009)
Daniel Gibbs, Acting President of the Territorial Council of Saint Martin (2009)
Frantz Gumbs, President of the Territorial Council of Saint Martin (2009–2012)
  (overseas collectivity of France)
Prefect –
Jean-Pierre Berçot, Prefect of Saint Pierre and Miquelon (2008–2009)
Jean-Régis Borius, Prefect of Saint Pierre and Miquelon (2009–2011)
Head of Government – Stéphane Artano, President of the Territorial Council of Saint Pierre and Miquelon (2006–2018)

Monarch – Elizabeth II, Queen of Saint Vincent and the Grenadines (1979–present)
Governor-General – Sir Frederick Ballantyne, Governor-General of Saint Vincent and the Grenadines (2002–2019)
Prime Minister – Ralph Gonsalves, Prime Minister of Saint Vincent and the Grenadines (2001–present)

President – George Maxwell Richards, President of Trinidad and Tobago (2003–2013)
Prime Minister – Patrick Manning, Prime Minister of Trinidad and Tobago (2001–2010)
 (Overseas Territory of the United Kingdom)
Governor – Gordon Wetherell, Governor of the Turks and Caicos Islands (2008–2011)
Premier –
Michael Misick, Premier of the Turks and Caicos Islands (2003–2009)
Galmo Williams, Premier of the Turks and Caicos Islands (2009)

President –
George W. Bush, President of the United States (2001–2009)
Barack Obama, President of the United States (2009–2017)
 (Commonwealth of the United States)
Governor –
Aníbal Acevedo Vilá, Governor of Puerto Rico (2005–2009)
Luis Fortuño, Governor of Puerto Rico (2009–2013)
 (insular area of the United States)
Governor – John de Jongh, Governor of the United States Virgin Islands (2007–2015)

Oceania
 (unorganised, unincorporated territory of the United States)
Governor – Togiola Tulafono, Governor of American Samoa (2003–2013)

Monarch – Elizabeth II, Queen of Australia (1952–present)
Governor-General – Quentin Bryce, Governor-General of Australia (2008–2014)
Prime Minister – Kevin Rudd, Prime Minister of Australia (2007–2010)
 (external territory of Australia)
Administrator –
Sheryl Klaffer, Acting administrator of Christmas Island (2008–2009)
Stephen Clay, Acting administrator of Christmas Island (2009)
Brian Lacy, Administrator of Christmas Island (2009–2012)
Shire-President – Gordon Thomson, Shire president of Christmas Island (2003–2011)
 (external territory of Australia)
Administrator –
Sheryl Klaffer, Acting administrator of the Cocos (Keeling) Islands (2008–2009)
Stephen Clay, Acting administrator of the Cocos (Keeling) Islands (2009)
Brian Lacy, Administrator of the Cocos (Keeling) Islands (2009–2012)
Shire-President –
Mohammad Said Chongkin, Shire president of the Cocos (Keeling) Islands (2007–2009)
Shane Charlston, Shire president of the Cocos (Keeling) Islands (2009)
Balmut Pirus, Shire president of the Cocos (Keeling) Islands (2009–2011)
 (self-governing territory of Australia)
Administrator – Owen Walsh, Administrator of Norfolk Island (2007–2012)
Chief Minister – Andre Nobbs, Chief Minister of Norfolk Island (2007–2010)

President –
Ratu Josefa Iloilo, President of Fiji (2007–2009)
Ratu Epeli Nailatikau, President of Fiji (2009–2015)
Prime Minister – Frank Bainimarama, Prime Minister of Fiji (2007–present)
  (overseas collectivity of France)
High Commissioner – Adolphe Colrat, High Commissioner of the Republic in French Polynesia (2008–2011)
President –
Gaston Tong Sang, President of French Polynesia (2008–2009)
Oscar Temaru, President of French Polynesia (2009)
Gaston Tong Sang, President of French Polynesia (2009–2011)
 (insular area of the United States)
Governor – Felix Perez Camacho, Governor of Guam (2003–2011)

President – Anote Tong, President of Kiribati (2003–2016)

President –
Litokwa Tomeing, President of the Marshall Islands (2008–2009)
Ruben Zackhras, Acting President of the Marshall Islands (2009)
Jurelang Zedkaia, President of the Marshall Islands (2009–2012)

President – Manny Mori, President of Micronesia (2007–2015)

President – Marcus Stephen, President of Nauru (2007–2011)
 (sui generis collectivity of France)
High Commissioner – Yves Dassonville, High Commissioner of New Caledonia (2007–2010)
Head of Government –
Harold Martin, President of the Government of New Caledonia (2007–2009)
Philippe Gomès, President of the Government of New Caledonia (2009–2011)

Monarch – Elizabeth II, Queen of New Zealand (1952–present)
Governor-General – Sir Anand Satyanand, Governor-General of New Zealand (2006–2011)
Prime Minister – John Key, Prime Minister of New Zealand (2008–2016)
 (associated state of New Zealand)
Queen's Representative – Sir Frederick Tutu Goodwin, Queen's Representative of the Cook Islands (2001–2013)
Prime Minister – Jim Marurai, Prime Minister of the Cook Islands (2004–2010)
 (associated state of New Zealand)
Premier – Toke Talagi, Premier of Niue (2008–present)
 (dependent territory of New Zealand)
Administrator –
David Payton, Administrator of Tokelau (2006–2009)
John Allen, Acting Administrator of Tokelau (2009–2011)
Head of Government –
Pio Tuia, Head of Government of Tokelau (2008–2009)
Foua Toloa, Head of Government of Tokelau (2009–2010)
 (Commonwealth of the United States)
Governor – Benigno Fitial, Governor of the Northern Mariana Islands (2006–2013)

President –
Tommy Remengesau, President of Palau (2001–2009)
Johnson Toribiong, President of Palau (2009–2013)

Monarch – Elizabeth II, Queen of Papua New Guinea (1975–present)
Governor-General – Sir Paulias Matane, Governor-General of Papua New Guinea (2004–2010)
Prime Minister – Sir Michael Somare, Prime Minister of Papua New Guinea (2002–2010)
 (Overseas Territory of the United Kingdom)
Governor – George Fergusson, Governor of the Pitcairn Islands (2006–2010)
Mayor – Mike Warren, Mayor of the Pitcairn Islands (2008–2013)

Head of State – Tufuga Efi, O le Ao o le Malo of Samoa (2007–2017)
Prime Minister – Tuilaepa Aiono Sailele Malielegaoi, Prime Minister of Samoa (1998–2021)

Monarch – Elizabeth II, Queen of the Solomon Islands (1978–present)
Governor-General –
Sir Nathaniel Waena, Governor-General of the Solomon Islands (2004–2009)
Sir Frank Kabui, Governor-General of the Solomon Islands (2009–2019)
Prime Minister – Derek Sikua, Prime Minister of the Solomon Islands (2007–2010)

Monarch – George Tupou V, King of Tonga (2006–2012)
Prime Minister – Feleti Sevele, Prime Minister of Tonga (2006–2010)

Monarch – Elizabeth II, Queen of Tuvalu (1978–present)
Governor-General – Sir Filoimea Telito, Governor-General of Tuvalu (2005–2010)
Prime Minister – Apisai Ielemia, Prime Minister of Tuvalu (2006–2010)

President –
Kalkot Mataskelekele, President of Vanuatu (2004–2009)
Maxime Carlot Korman, Acting President of Vanuatu (2009)
Iolu Abil, President of Vanuatu (2009–2014)
Prime Minister – Edward Natapei, Prime Minister of Vanuatu (2008–2010)
  (overseas collectivity of France)
Administrator – Philippe Paolantoni, Administrator Superior of Wallis and Futuna (2008–2010)
Head of Government – Victor Brial, President of the Territorial Assembly of Wallis and Futuna (2007–2010)

South America

President – Cristina Fernández de Kirchner, President of Argentina (2007–2015)

President – Evo Morales, President of Bolivia (2006–2019)

President – Luiz Inácio Lula da Silva, President of Brazil (2003–2010)

President – Michelle Bachelet, President of Chile (2006–2010)

President – Álvaro Uribe, President of Colombia (2002–2010)

President – Rafael Correa, President of Ecuador (2007–2017)
 (Overseas Territory of the United Kingdom)
Governor – Alan Huckle, Governor of the Falkland Islands (2006–2010)
Head of Government – Tim Thorogood, Chief Executive of the Falkland Islands (2008–2012)

President – Bharrat Jagdeo, President of Guyana (1999–2011)
Prime Minister – Sam Hinds, Prime Minister of Guyana (1999–2015)

President – Fernando Lugo, President of Paraguay (2008–2012)

President – Alan García, President of Peru (2006–2011)
Prime Minister –
Yehude Simon, President of the Council of Ministers of Peru (2008–2009)
Javier Velásquez, President of the Council of Ministers of Peru (2009–2010)

President – Ronald Venetiaan, President of Suriname (2000–2010)

President – Tabaré Vázquez, President of Uruguay (2005–2010)

President – Hugo Chávez, President of Venezuela (2002–2013)

Notes

External links
Rulersa list of rulers throughout time and places
WorldStatesmenan online encyclopedia of the leaders of nations and territories

State leaders
State leaders
State leaders
2009